The Thomas P. Jernigan House is a historic home located at 918 Dunlap Street, Paris, Henry County, Tennessee.

It was built in 1905 and added to the National Register in 1988.

References

Houses in Henry County, Tennessee